Andrew Frew (born 9 March 1975) is an Australian former professional rugby league footballer who played in the 1990s and 2000s. He attended Patrician Brothers' College, Fairfield. He played at club level for the Parramatta Eels, Manly-Warringah Sea Eagles, Northern Eagles, Huddersfield Giants, Wakefield Trinity Wildcats, Halifax and St. George Illawarra Dragons, as a er although he could play  or  if needed.

Playing career
A noted speedster, Frew placed second to Newcastle Knights flyer Darren Albert in a rugby league sprint for The NRL Footy Show in 1999 at ES Marks Athletics Field, a race that featured other selected players from the NRL including Justin Loomans (3rd - Souths), Michael De Vere (Brisbane) and Matthew Rieck (Penrith).

Arrest
Frew was arrested in September 2012 and charged with the blackmail of a 58-year-old Lane Cove man. The man repeatedly gave Frew money as he was concerned that Frew would send information of an alleged sexual abuse of Frew's partner (at a time she was an underage prostitute) to his friends suggesting the victim was a pedophile.

Police say Frew and another woman drove the man to ATMs between 16 June and July 2012, forcing him to withdraw thousands of dollars from ATMs.

The court heard Frew and his co-accused, a 38-year-old woman, went to the man's house, where he lived with his elderly father, and demanded money, when searched by police, the drug ice was found in his anus.

On 14 May 2013, Frew was jailed for one-year and placed on a corrections order for his role in blackmailing the 58-year-old man.

Notes

References

1975 births
Australian rugby league players
Halifax R.L.F.C. players
Huddersfield Giants players
Manly Warringah Sea Eagles players
Northern Eagles players
Parramatta Eels players
Place of birth missing (living people)
Rugby league centres
Rugby league fullbacks
Rugby league wingers
St. George Illawarra Dragons players
Wakefield Trinity players
Living people